Prunus glandulosa, called Chinese bush cherry, Chinese plum, and dwarf flowering almond, is a species of shrub tree native to China and long present in Japan. It is commonly used as an ornamental tree and for cut flowers.

It has white or pink flowers - single or double varies with cultivar - that bloom in Spring. Fruits are dark red. Leaves are alternating, pointy, and light green. It is drought tolerant. It is susceptible to mice as well as these diseases: fire blight, leaf spot, die back, leaf curl, powdery mildew, root rot, and honey fungus.

Cultivars include: 'Alba' - (single white flowers), 'Alba Plena' (also 'Alboplena') - (double white flowers), 'Lawrence' - (single white-pink flowers), 'Rosea Plena' (also 'Sinensis') - (double pink flowers).

References

External links
 
 
 

glandulosa
Flora of China